The 23rd government of Turkey (25 December 1957 – 27 May 1960) was a government in the history of Turkey. It is also called the fifth Menderes government.

Background 

Democrat Party (DP) won the elections held on 27 October 1957, and its leader Adnan Menderes formed the government.

The government
In the list below, the cabinet members who served only a part of the cabinet's lifespan are shown in the column "Notes".

Aftermath
The government ended with the 1960 Turkish coup d'état.

References

Cabinets of Turkey
Democrat Party (Turkey, 1946–1961) politicians
1957 establishments in Turkey
1960 disestablishments in Turkey
Cabinets established in 1957
Cabinets disestablished in 1960
Members of the 23rd government of Turkey
11th parliament of Turkey
Democrat Party (Turkey, 1946–1961)